The Burys at Godalming, Surrey was used as the venue for nine first-class cricket matches between 1821 and 1830. It was used by the Godalming Cricket Club for all of its home matches and by Surrey teams.

References

1821 establishments in England
Cricket grounds in Surrey
Defunct cricket grounds in England
Defunct sports venues in Surrey
English cricket in the 19th century
History of Surrey
Sports venues completed in 1821